The Naval Aircraft Factory TF (Tandem Fighter) was an American twin-engine flying-boat escort fighter first flown in October 1920. The aircraft originated from requirements drafted by the British Technical Committee in April 1918, after discussion approved the development of a long-range seaborne fighter capable of escorting Allied maritime reconnaissance sorties over the North Sea and Atlantic regions.

Development
Following the armistice, the incentives to produce a fighter eventually deviated toward evaluating the prospective applications of a highly unique concept. Upon review of numerous proposals, the Aeronautics Division of the U.S. Bureau of Engineering referred recommendations to the Chief of Naval Operations in which to finalize approval of a submission by the Naval Aircraft Factory (NAF) with which to produce a pre-production series of four prototypes at an estimated construction cost of $84,680.

Accordingly, the NAF proposal consisted of a twin-engine flying boat which featured a hull design identical to that of the Curtiss NC-1, an armament of four flexible mounting Lewis machine guns, and four crew members. An egg-like nacelle atop the upper wing housed an additional pilot/gunner's position. Initially designated as Twin Fighter (TF), a review of the aircraft's dimensions showed that the wingspan was insufficient for a conventional two-engine layout. Thus, the Bureau of Engineering revised the engine configuration into a tractor/pusher combination mounted on the aircraft centerline. This change altered the designation from Twin to Tandem fighter. The TF was designed to incorporate two Curtiss-built  Kirkham inline engines, however mechanical problems hindered the development of these power plants, so two  Hispano Suiza engines were adopted instead.

Operational history

Flight testing
Construction of the four prototypes (serial numbers A-5576, A-5577, A-5578, and A-5579) began in August 1919. The first TF was completed on October 1, 1920, with the first flight taking place 12 days later. However, high throttle settings caused the engines to overheat, thus obliging the pilot to undertake an emergency landing at the mouth of the Delaware River. After a brief waiting period to allow the engines to cool, the aircraft was damaged upon collision with an ocean liner's wake during another takeoff attempt. Other problems noted during initial testing were stiff and erratic rudder control while the ailerons exhibited a tendency to roll in directions opposite to that of rudder control. While subsequent modifications to the tail section remedied the stability problems, the propensity of the engines to overheat at high RPM settings remained an ongoing hindrance to the testing procedure, not only causing several premature landings, but ultimately providing the most decisive factor in the TF's subsequent cancellation.

Cancellation
In June 1921, the Trial Board appealed to the U.S. Navy Department for immediate termination of the project, arguing that:

The power plant defects in this plane can be overcome, but not those pertaining to its air worthiness and sea worthiness, unless the plane is largely redesigned. In view of the numerous defects in this plane, and its questionable utility, even though these defects were remedied, it is recommended that further experimental work on this plane be discontinued.

The Navy Department dismissed the recommendations as premature, arguing that plans to retrofit the second and third prototypes with enlarged radiators in conjunction with alternate engine types might elicit a more successful outcome. However, the specialized radiators failed to arrive for several months, thereby postponing the completion of both types to the midpoint of 1922. Furthermore, the test flight of the third prototype (A-5578) in July ended in another mechanical failure which destroyed the primary water tank, the resulting fragments of which in turn damaged the hull section and shattered the forward propeller. With little hope for any significant improvements in the allotted evaluation phase, the Trial Board issued another plea to the Navy Department on December 29, to which the latter immediately complied, issuing its formal cancellation of the TF project on January 11, 1923.

Specifications (A-5576)

Summary of Flight Trials (A-5576) - Oct. 1920 - Mar. 1921

RPM/Speed Readings Obtained During Flight Trials on Oct. 13, 1920 (A-5576)

References

Notes

Bibliography

RNAF-Z-17, General correspondence of Bureau of Construction and Repair in matters pertaining to Naval Aircraft Factory TF, Record Group 72.2.3, U.S. National Archives, Washington D.C.Z-17-736-8-DA-25, General correspondence of Bureau of Engineering in matters pertaining to Naval Aircraft Factory TF, Record Group 72.2.1, U.S. National Archives, Washington D.C.OS-Z-7, Records of Bureau of Aeronautics related to Naval Aircraft Factory TF, Record Group 72, U.S. National Archives, Washington D.C.''

1920s United States fighter aircraft
Flying boats
TF
Twin-engined push-pull aircraft
Biplanes
Aircraft first flown in 1920